The 2009 Clipsal 500 was the first race of the 2009 V8 Supercar Championship Series. It was held on the weekend of 20–22 March around the inner city streets of Adelaide, the capital of South Australia.

Qualifying
Qualifying was held on Friday 20 March, and was split into two sessions. Session one lasted for 34 minutes, 15 seconds and saw the top ten drivers qualifying for the Top Ten Shootout, with positions 11–30 being set by times in the session. In this first session, reigning series champion Jamie Whincup set the pace, setting a new qualifying lap record of 1:21.2773. Although he was some half a second slower in the Shootout, Whincup was still quick enough to lead a Triple Eight Race Engineering 1–2 with Craig Lowndes 0.2545 seconds behind. Mark Winterbottom and Lee Holdsworth had both gone faster than Lowndes but both drivers lost their respective times due to excessive use of kerbing during their hot laps. Garth Tander was top Holden in third, with James Courtney qualifying fourth, in his first session as a Dick Johnson Racing driver.

Race 1
Race 1 was held on Saturday 21 March.

Race 2
Race 2 was held on Sunday 22 March.

Results

Race 1 results

Race 2 results

Post-race
Russell Ingall and James Courtney were given ten-point deductions after the weekend for careless driving.

Standings
 After Round 1 of 14

Support categories
The 2009 Clipsal 500 had five support categories.

References

External links
Clipsal 500 website
Official timing and results

Adelaide 500
Clipsal
2000s in Adelaide
March 2009 sports events in Australia